Bruce Sassmann (born August 11, 1950) is an American politician and businessman serving as a member of the Missouri House of Representatives from the 62nd district. Elected in November 2020, he assumed office on January 6, 2021. Redistricting in 2022 placed his home in the new 61st district, so he ran for reelection there.

Early life and education 
Sassmann was born in Washington, Missouri in 1950. After graduating from Bland High School in 1968, he earned a Bachelor of Science degree in education from Missouri State University and an Associate of Science in funeral funeral service from St. Louis Community College–Forest Park.

Career 
Outside of politics, Sassmann operated his family's funeral businesses. He is also a landlord. Sassmann was elected to the Missouri House of Representatives in November 2020 and assumed office on January 6, 2021.

Electoral History

References 

1950 births
Living people
People from Washington, Missouri
Republican Party members of the Missouri House of Representatives
Missouri State University alumni
St. Louis Community College alumni